Strange, in comics, may refer to:

Strange (comic book), a six-issue comic book limited series by Marvel ComicsWorlds of JMS page
Strange, a Marvel Comics character and one of two characters who together were known as the Strangers
Adam Strange, fictional DC Comics superhero
Doc Strange, fictional Thrilling Comics character
Doctor Strange, fictional Marvel Comics sorcerer
Hugo Strange, fictional DC Comics character
Strange Visitor, a DC Comics character who appeared alongside Superman

See also
Strange (disambiguation)
Strangers (disambiguation)

References